Babajan Darreh (also Romanized as Bābājān Darreh) is a village in Kojid Rural District, Rankuh District, Amlash County, Gilan Province, Iran. At the 2006 census, its population was 13, in 4 families.

References 

Populated places in Amlash County